The 1956 Minnesota lieutenant gubernatorial election took place on November 6, 1956. Incumbent Lieutenant Governor Karl Rolvaag of the Minnesota Democratic-Farmer-Labor Party defeated Republican Party of Minnesota challenger Leonard R. Dickinson.

Results

External links
 Election Returns

Minnesota
Lieutenant Gubernatorial
1956